Metro Toronto Hostel Services was a department within the former  Regional Municipality of Metropolitan Toronto.

It was responsible for providing housing and shelters for homeless in Metro Toronto not run by non-profit organizations. It was an operating division under Metro Toronto Community Services.

This department is now under Toronto Community Services department.

Metropolitan Toronto